Brewersville is an unincorporated community in Sand Creek Township, Jennings County, Indiana.

History
Brewersville was founded in 1837 by Jacob Brewer, and named for him. A post office was established at Brewersville in 1844, and remained in operation until it was discontinued in 1931.

Geography

References

Unincorporated communities in Jennings County, Indiana
Unincorporated communities in Indiana